Frederick Packer may refer to:

 Fred L. Packer (1886–1956), American illustrator and cartoonist
 Frederick Augustus Packer (1839–1902), Australian composer